Edwin Archer Mills (17 May 1878 – 12 November 1946) was a British tug of war competitor who competed in the 1908 Summer Olympics, in the 1912 Summer Olympics, and in the 1920 Summer Olympics.

He was part of the British team City of London Police which won two gold medals in 1908 and 1920 and the joint City of London Police-Metropolitan Police "K" Division British team which won a silver medal in 1912.

He also competed in the heavyweight division of both the Greco-Roman and Freestyle wrestling competitions at the 1908 olympic Games.

Gallery

Notes

References

External links
profile
profile Olympic Sports

1878 births
1946 deaths
City of London Police officers
Olympic tug of war competitors of Great Britain
Tug of war competitors at the 1908 Summer Olympics
Tug of war competitors at the 1912 Summer Olympics
Tug of war competitors at the 1920 Summer Olympics
English Olympic medallists
Olympic gold medallists for Great Britain
Olympic silver medallists for Great Britain
Olympic medalists in tug of war
Medalists at the 1920 Summer Olympics
Medalists at the 1912 Summer Olympics
Medalists at the 1908 Summer Olympics